The following is a complete chronology of the various line-ups of punk rock music group Reagan Youth.  Reagan Youth formed in New York, NY in 1980, became inactive in 1990, and reformed in 2006, thirteen years after the death of lead singer and co-founder Dave Rubinstein.

Reagan Youth